West of Loathing is a comedy adventure role-playing video game developed by Asymmetric Publications and released on August 10, 2017.

The game takes place in the universe of Asymmetric's Kingdom of Loathing, in a fantasy Western themed frontier setting. The player character leaves the family farm and heads west to seek their fortune on a trek to the city of Frisco. The game was well received by critics, with Rolling Stone describing it as "one of the year's best games."

Gameplay
West of Loathing is a single-player role-playing video game with turn-based combat. The game's art is made up of stick figure drawings.

Development and release
West of Loathing was developed by Asymmetric Publications. The game was announced in May 2016 as a follow-up to the browser-based multiplayer online role-playing game Kingdom of Loathing (2003). West of Loathing was submitted to the Greenlight community voting system on digital distribution service Steam.

West of Loathing was released for Linux, macOS, and Windows on August 10, 2017. An iOS version once was scheduled for a 2017 release. A Nintendo Switch version was released for download May 31, 2018. It was released for Stadia on July 1, 2020.

A DLC expansion pack called Reckonin' at Gun Manor was released on February 8, 2019, for the PC version of the game. It was released on the Nintendo Switch on January 21, 2020.

Reception

West of Loathing received "generally favourable" reviews from professional critics according to review aggregator website Metacritic.

Writing for Polygon Noah Caldwell-Gervais lauded West of Loathing's humorous writing, music, and its underlying "surprising intricacy of design," while PC Gamer reviewer Christopher Livingston called the game a "delightfully written RPG absolutely packed with humor," but criticized its relatively simple combat system. In a review for Rock, Paper, Shotgun, Alec Meer recommended the game and praised its warm and welcoming tone.

West of Loathing was awarded Best Comedy Game and nominated for Best Open World Game in PC Gamers 2017 Game of the Year Awards, and was ranked #16 on Polygons "50 Best Games of 2017." It was also nominated for "PC Game of the Year" at the Golden Joystick Awards, for "Gamer's Voice (Video Game)" at the SXSW Gaming Gamer's Voice Awards, and for the Seumas McNally Grand Prize at the Independent Games Festival Competition Awards.

Soundtrack 
The music of West of Loathing was composed by Ryan Ike and gained praise as a "pitch-perfect Spaghetti Western soundtrack." The 20-track soundtrack was licensed and released by video game music label Materia Collective.

References

External links

 

2017 video games
Fantasy Westerns
IOS games
Linux games
MacOS games
Monochrome video games
Nintendo Switch games
Parody video games
Role-playing video games
Single-player video games
Stadia games
Video games developed in the United States
Western (genre) video games
Windows games